Black is a color corresponding to the absence of light.

Black may also refer to:

People and fictional characters
Black people, a racial categorization of humans mostly used for people of Sub-Saharan African descent and the indigenous peoples of Oceania.
Black (singer) (1962–2016), a stage name for Colin Vearncombe
Black (surname), a list of people and fictional characters
List of people known as the Black, various people, real or fictional

Places

Terrestrial
The Black Sea, a sea between Europe and Asia
Black, Alabama, a town, United States
Black, Illinois, an unincorporated community, United States
Black, Missouri, an unincorporated community, United States
Black, West Virginia, an unincorporated community, United States
Black Glacier, Victoria Land, Antarctica
Black Head (disambiguation)
Black Hill (disambiguation)
Black Island (disambiguation)
Black Lake (disambiguation)
Black Mountain (disambiguation)
Black Mountains (disambiguation)
Black Peak (disambiguation)
Black River (disambiguation)
Black Town, another name for George Town, in India
Black Township (disambiguation)
Black Volcano, an inactive volcano near Albuquerque, New Mexico, United States
The Black-E, a community arts centre in Liverpool, England

Extraterrestrial
Black (crater), a lunar crater
11207 Black, a main-belt asteroid

Art and entertainment

Film and television
Black (2004 film), a Malayalam film directed by Ranjith Balakrishnan
Black (2005 film), a Hindi film directed by Sanjay Leela Bhansali
Black (2008 film), a French heist film directed Pierre Laffargue
Black (2015 Belgian film), a Belgian crime film by Adil El Arbi and Bilall Fallah
Black (2015 Bengali film), a Bengali film directed by Raja Chanda
Black (South Korean TV series), a 2017 South Korean TV series
Black (Indian TV series), a 2009 Hindi-language Indian television series
Pacific Rim: The Black, a 2021 Netflix animated television series
"Black" (Supernatural), a 2014 television episode of the Supernatural fantasy U.S. TV show

Games
Black (video game), a 2006 first-person shooter
Pokémon Black and White, 2011 video games for the Nintendo DS
Twisted Metal: Black, a 2001 vehicle combat video game
White and Black in chess

Literature
Black (novel), a novel in the Circle Trilogy by Ted Dekker
Black (play), a play by Joyce Carol Oates

Music
Black (event), a Dutch hardstyle event
Black (singer), stage name of English singer Colin Vearncombe
Black (video), a live performance video by Psychic TV
Black (Bangladeshi band), a Bangladeshi rock band
The Black (American band), an American rock band

Albums
Black (band Black album), 2011
Black (singer Black album), 1987
Black (Dierks Bentley album) or the title song (see below), 2016
Black (Lee Hyori album) or the title song, 2017
Black (Lita Ford album) or the title song, 1994
Black (Project Pitchfork album), 2013
The Black (album) or the title song, by Asking Alexandria, 2016
The Black (EP), by William Control, 2017

Songs
"Black" (Dierks Bentley song), 2016
"Black" (Pearl Jam song), 1991
"Black" (Sevendust song), 1997
"Black" (Trivium song), 2012
"Black", by Basement from Colourmeinkindness, 2012
"Black", by Danger Mouse and Daniele Luppi from Rome, 2011
"Black", by Dave from Psychodrama, 2019
"Black", by Guru Randhawa, 2019
"Black", by Motionless in White from The Whorror, 2007
"Black", by Neurosis from Pain of Mind, 1987
"Black", by Sarah McLachlan from Solace, 1991
"Black", by Will Oldham from I See a Darkness, 1999

Other uses
Black (horse), a coat color of horse
Black (turkey), a breed of domestic turkey
Black (automobile), a 19th-century U.S. automobile
Black Motor Company, an American automobile manufacturer from 1908 to 1910
Boeing Black, a phone by Boeing
A slang for a Black & Mild, a tobacco product

See also
6LACK (pronounced black), a stage name for Ricardo Valentine
Blak, term used by Indigenous Australians in cultural/political spheres as a reclamation of identity
Blacc (disambiguation)
Black and white (disambiguation)
Black's (disambiguation)
Blacks (disambiguation)

Black v Chrétien, a Canadian law case
Bläk, a former private club in Helsinki, Finland